Augustus Island is one of the many uninhabited Canadian Arctic islands in the Qikiqtaaluk Region, Nunavut. It is a Baffin Island offshore island located in inner Frobisher Bay. The island lies at the head of Ward Inlet, between Becher Peninsula and Hall Peninsula. Bruce Island is located at the mouth of the inlet. Other islands in the immediate vicinity include Algerine Island, Frobisher's Farthest, McBride Island, and Pichit Island.

The island was named by American Arctic explorer Charles Francis Hall.

References 

Islands of Baffin Island
Uninhabited islands of Qikiqtaaluk Region
Islands of Frobisher Bay